Konstantin Nikolaevich Fomichev ( - born 30 August 1977 in Ufa, Russian SFSR, Soviet Union) is a Russian sprint canoeist who competed from the late 1990s to the mid-2000s. He won nine medals at the ICF Canoe Sprint World Championships with four golds (C-2 200 m, C-4 200 m, C-4 500 m, C-4 1000 m: all 1999), three silvers (C-4 500 m: 2002, C-4 1000 m: 1997, 1998), and two bronzes (C-4 200 m: 1998, C-4 500 m: 2001).

Formichev also finished ninth in the C-1 1000 m event at the 2004 Summer Olympics in Athens.

References

1977 births
Canoeists at the 2004 Summer Olympics
Living people
Olympic canoeists of Russia
Russian male canoeists
ICF Canoe Sprint World Championships medalists in Canadian
Sportspeople from Ufa